Babe Ruth Field was a ballpark in Ventura, California, United States, named after the famous baseball player George Herman ("Babe") Ruth, (1895–1948), of Baltimore, that was used as a minor-league park from 1948 to 1955. Tenant franchises (all of the old California League) included the Ventura Yankees, (1947–1949), the Ventura Braves, (1950–1952), and the Channel Cities Oilers, (1954–1955).

The site of the old stadium is now the Ventura County Fairgrounds adjacent parking lot, now directly in front of the Ventura train platform/station, served by Amtrak's (National Rail Passenger Corp.), West Coastal trains, the Pacific Surfliner, from San Diego to San Luis Obispo, and the non-stop express Coast Starlight. This broad flat area adjacent to the Pacific Ocean beach has been known as "Seaside Park" after Eugene P. (E. P.) and Orpha Foster donated the land to the public. They envisioned a beautiful waterfront gateway to the town of Ventura, where families could walk, picnic, and enjoy family outings.

References

Defunct minor league baseball venues
Baseball venues in California
Sports venues in Ventura County, California
Buildings and structures in Ventura, California
Defunct baseball venues in the United States
Demolished sports venues in California